The Esmeralda County Courthouse, built in 1907, is a historic two-story county courthouse located on the northeast corner of Crook Avenue (U.S. 95) and Euclid Avenue in Goldfield, Esmeralda County, Nevada. It is a contributing property in the Goldfield Historic District and still serves as the county's courthouse.

See also
 Mineral County Courthouse, the previous courthouse for Esmeralda County

References

External links
 Tonopahpictures: Esmeralda Courthouse (has interior images)

County courthouses in Nevada
Goldfield, Nevada
Buildings and structures in Esmeralda County, Nevada
History of Esmeralda County, Nevada
Government buildings completed in 1907
Courthouses on the National Register of Historic Places in Nevada
Historic district contributing properties in Nevada
1907 establishments in Nevada
National Register of Historic Places in Esmeralda County, Nevada